David or Dave McCarthy may refer to:

 David McCarthy (politician) (1920s–1973), unionist politician in Northern Ireland
 David McCarthy (sprinter) (born 1983), Irish sprint athlete from Dublin who medalled at the 2004 World Indoors
 David McCarthy (long-distance runner) (born 1988), Irish long-distance athlete from Waterford who medalled at the 2009 European Under-23s
 David J. McCarthy Jr., dean of the Georgetown University Law Center
 David J. McCarthy, American numismatist, author and researcher
 Dave McCarthy (Gaelic footballer) (born 1949), Irish Gaelic football player
 Dave McCarthy (hurler) (born 1994), Irish hurler